Chimarocephala pacifica, known generally as the painted meadow grasshopper or painted grasshopper, is a species of band-winged grasshopper in the family Acrididae. It is found in Central America and North America.

Subspecies
These two subspecies belong to the species Chimarocephala pacifica:
 Chimarocephala pacifica incisa
 Chimarocephala pacifica pacifica

References

Oedipodinae
Articles created by Qbugbot
Insects described in 1873